This is a list of astronomical observatories ordered by name, along with initial dates of operation (where an accurate date is available) and location. The list also includes a final year of operation for many observatories that are no longer in operation. While other sciences, such as volcanology and meteorology, also use facilities called observatories for research and observations, this list is limited to observatories that are used to observe celestial objects.

Astronomical observatories are mainly divided into four categories: space-based, airborne, ground-based, and underground-based.

Many modern telescopes and observatories are located in space to observe astronomical objects in wavelengths of the electromagnetic spectrum that cannot penetrate the Earth's atmosphere (such as ultraviolet radiation, X-rays, and gamma rays) and are thus impossible to observe using ground-based telescopes.
Being above the atmosphere, these space observatories can also avoid the effects of atmospheric turbulence that plague ground based telescopes, although new generations of adaptive optics telescopes have since then dramatically improved the situation on the ground. The space high vacuum environment also frees the detectors from the ancestral diurnal cycle due to the atmospheric blue light background of the sky, thereby increasing significantly the observation time.

An intermediate variant is the airborne observatory, specialised in the infrared wavelengths of the EM spectrum, that conduct observations above the part of the atmosphere containing water vapor that absorbs them, in the stratosphere.

Historically, astronomical observatories consisted generally in a building or group of buildings where observations of astronomical objects such as sunspots, planets, asteroids, comets, stars, nebulae, and galaxies in the visible wavelengths of the electromagnetic spectrum were conducted. At first, for millennia, astronomical observations have been made with naked eyes. Then with the discovery of optics, with the help of different types of refractor telescopes and later with reflector telescopes. Their use allowed to dramatically increase both the collecting power and limit of resolution, thus the brightness, level of detail and apparent angular size of distant celestial objects allowing them to be better studied and understood. Following the development of modern physics, new ground based facilities have been constructed to conduct research in the radio and microwave wavelengths of the electromagnetic spectrum, with radio telescopes and dedicated microwave telescopes.

Modern astrophysics has extended the field of study of celestial bodies to non electromagnetic vectors, such as neutrinos, neutrons and cosmic-rays or gravitational waves. Thus new types of observatories have been developed. Interferometers are at the core of gravitational wave detectors. In order to limit the natural or artificial background noise, most particle detector based observatories are built deep underground.

Observatories

See also 

 Lists of telescopes
 :Category:Astronomical observatories by country
 History of the telescope
 List of astronomical instrument makers
 List of highest astronomical observatories
 List of largest optical reflecting telescopes
 List of largest optical refracting telescopes
 List of observatory codes
 List of planetariums
 List of radio telescopes
 List of telescope types
 Science tourism
 Space observatory
 Timeline of telescopes, observatories, and observing technology

References

External links 
Ecuador National Observatory
 History of Astronomy: Observatories and other places
 American observatories by state/Link expired
 Observatories with Clear Sky Clocks
 Map of observatory locations

Observatories
Observatories